The Fabulous Four may refer to:

 Fab Four, the Beatles
 The Fabulous Four (Swedish band) (1965–1968), with Lalla Hansson
 a group of boxers from the 1980s consisting of Sugar Ray Leonard, Roberto Durán, Thomas Hearns, and Marvin Hagler
 a nickname for Naval Mobile Construction Battalion 4
 a group of cricketers who all debuted around the same time: Virat Kohli, Joe Root, Kane Williamson, and Steve Smith (cricketer), coined in 2014 by Martin Crowe
 The Fabulous Four, an upcoming comedy film directed by Jocelyn Moorhouse and starring Susan Sarandon, Bette Midler, Megan Mullally, and Sissy Spacek

See also
 Fab Four (disambiguation)
 Fabulous Foursome (disambiguation)